Alphonse Alkan (also known as Alphonse the Elder, 1809 in Paris – 1889 in Neuilly-sur-Seine) was a French printer, bibliographer, and author. He was a brother of Eugène Alcan but the reason for the difference in the orthography of the family name has never been explained.  He first worked as a practical printer, then wrote for various typographical and bibliographical reviews, and subsequently was appointed secretary and proof-reader to the Count de Clarac, keeper of the Museum of Antiquities in the Louvre. Alkan was a prolific writer and the author of many books, pamphlets, and articles, which deal with the art and history of printing and illustrating as well as with bibliography.

The Jewish Encyclopedia lists his most important books as: 
 Les Femmes Compositrices d'Imprimerie sous la Révolution Française de 1794, par un Ancien Typographe, 1862 (anonymous) 
 Les Graveurs de Portraits en France, 1879 
 Documents pour Servir à l'Histoire de la Librairie Parisienne, 1879
 Les Livres et Leurs Ennemis, 1883
 Les Etiquettes et les Inscriptions des Boîtes-Volumes de Pierre Jannet, Fondateur de la Bibliothèque Elzéverienne, 1883
 Edouard René Lefèbvre de Laboulaye, un Fondeur en Caractères, Membre de l'Institut, 1886 
 Berbignier et SonLivre: les Farfadets, 1889 
 Les Quatre Doyens de la Typographie Parisienne, 1889

References

External links
 

1809 births
1889 deaths
Writers from Paris
French bibliographers
French printers
19th-century French Jews
Jewish French writers
19th-century French writers
French male essayists
19th-century French businesspeople
19th-century French male writers
19th-century French essayists